The Footwork FA15 was a Formula One car with which the Footwork team competed in the 1994 Formula One World Championship. The number 9 seat was taken by Christian Fittipaldi and the number 10 seat was taken by Gianni Morbidelli. The team never employed a test driver. The engine was a Ford HBE7/8 3.5 V8, the same type used in the McLaren MP4/8 the previous season. The team did not have a main sponsor.

Race history
The FA15 was very competitive in the early races of the year: Morbidelli qualified sixth in Brazil, Fittipaldi finished fourth in Aida (where Morbidelli retired from fifth), and Fittipaldi qualified sixth and ran fifth in Monaco before he suffered a gearbox failure, whilst Morbidelli qualified seventh. But after that, the team's performance began to suffer, with Morbidelli only finishing four races in the entire season and Fittipaldi frequently finishing outside the points. 

However, the team still managed the occasional good performance. Morbidelli ran well in Canada, whilst Fittipaldi finished sixth, only to be disqualified due to being underweight. In Germany the cars finished fourth and fifth, with Morbidelli scoring a point in Belgium and qualifying a strong eighth in Jerez for the European GP.

The team finished 9th in the Constructors' Championship, with nine points, a respectable performance. Fittipaldi left Formula One at the end of the season, and was replaced by Taki Inoue for 1995.

Race results
(key)

References

External links

1994 Formula One season cars
Arrows Formula One cars